A shoemaker is a person making shoes.

Shoemaker may also refer to:

 Shoemaker (surname)
 NEAR Shoemaker, a NASA mission to study 433 Eros
 The Shoemaker: The Anatomy of a Psychotic (1983) a book about serial killer Joseph Kallinger by Flora Rheta Schreiber.
 The Shoemaker (2011 play) a stageplay written by Susan Charlotte
 102P/Shoemaker (aka Shoemaker 1) a comet
 Shoemaker (lunar crater), a lunar impact crater
 Shoemaker (film), a 1996 Canadian drama film
 Shoemaker (song) by Finnish symphonic metal band Nightwish about geologist Eugene Shoemaker

See also
 Shoemaker crater (disambiguation)
 Schumacher (disambiguation), a surname and list of people with the name
 Schumaker, a surname and list of people with the name
 Schoonmaker (disambiguation)
 Yochanan Hasandlar, "The Sandal Maker", Jewish sage of the Second Century AD
 Comet Shoemaker–Levy 9, a comet that crashed into planet Jupiter